Stamnes may refer to the following locations:

Stamnes, also known as Stamneshella, a village in Vaksdal municipality in Vestland county, Norway
Stamnes Church, a church in Vaksdal municipality in Vestland county, Norway
Stamnes, Nordland, a former municipality in Nordland county, Norway